"Tatsulok" (Filipino word literally translated to Triangle; paraphrased as Pyramid) is a Filipino folk song originally composed by Rom Dongeto in 1989 and performed in 1991 by his trio folk-rock band, called "Buklod", which includes Noel Cabangon and Rene Boncocan. The song explains to a young man that there's an ongoing war and that the war is just the effect of a bigger problem.  It tells the young man to take action and topple a pyramid tite upside-down to end a never-ending war between the rich and the poor.

The song was popularized in 2007 by the band, Bamboo, when they released their third album We Stand Alone Together with their version of Tatsulok along with it. Since the release of Bamboo's Tatsulok, the song has become the anthem of young Filipino activists.

History 
"Tatsulok" was originally sung in 1991 by a trio folk-rock band, Buklod, who writes and performs songs about environment, politics, and human rights.  The song was written in 1989 by Rom Dongeto, during the so-called "Total War Policy" of Philippine Government, under the late President Corazon Aquino with New People's Army (abbreviated as NPA), the armed wing of revolutionary organization, Communist Party of the Philippines. 
 The NPA is referenced in the song as the color "Red" (Filipino: "pula") due to association to Communism and the Philippine Government is referenced as the color "Yellow" (Filipino: "dilaw"), being the color that Aquino is known for.

The song explains that the armed conflict between the NPA and the Philippine Government under Aquino Administration is just the effect of a bigger problem.  To fully understand, before Aquino came into office, Philippines was on a nine year Martial Law under late President Ferdinand Marcos.  And NPA was one of the groups that helped toppled Marcos, vacating the seat which Aquino later took when she was inaugurated on 5 February 1986. So the war of NPA with the previous Marcos administration of Philippine Government simply continued under Aquino administration, thus the "never-ending war".

Renewed popularity
In 2007, a now-defunct Filipino rock band, Bamboo released their third album, We Stand Alone Together, with their version of "Tatsulok" as the carrier single.  The song topped the Philippine Music charts breathing new life to the song.

In 2018, Buklod re-released the song on their new album which marked the band's three decades since formation in 1987.

In 2020, Filipino folk-pop band, Ben&Ben, performed a ballad rendition of the song on their BBTV episode on 12 August 2020.

See also
 "Bella Ciao" - an Italian protest song popularized by Netflix' Money Heist

References

1989 songs
Philippine folk songs
Tagalog-language songs